Chisholm Trail Museum may refer to:

Chisholm Trail Museum (Wellington, Kansas)
Chisholm Trail Museum (Kingfisher, Oklahoma)
Chisholm Trail Museum (Cleburne, Texas)

See also
Chisholm Trail Heritage Center, in Duncan, Oklahoma
Chisholm Trail Historical Museum, in Waurika, Oklahoma